Tacacho is a traditional Peruvian meal that is typically served for breakfast. It is popular in the Amazonas region, where the natives boil or grill plantains, peel them, then mash them in a large wooden mortar. When mashed, the plantains are combined with lard, salt, and tiny pieces of pork rind and served with vegetables and chorizo on the side.

Origin 
This dish originated in west Africa. In the Caribbean and parts of South America with large African influences the plantains are boiled or roasted and typically smashed with garlic.

See also
Mofongo
Fufu
Mangú

References

Peruvian cuisine
Ecuadorian cuisine
Banana dishes
Pork dishes